Lesotho, a country in Southern Africa, is home to several languages, including Phuthi, Sesotho, Xhosa, Zulu and English, — all, except for English, belong to the Niger–Congo language family.

National and official languages 

Sesotho (or Southern Sesotho), a Southern Bantu language, is the national language of Lesotho, and is spoken by most Basotho.  It was recognized as the national language by the National and Official Languages Bill, ratified by the National Assembly of Lesotho on 12 September 1966, which also established Sesotho and English as the country's two official languages.  The country's language policy promotes bilingualism, and Chapter 1 of the Constitution of Lesotho states:

Sesotho is the first language of more than 90 percent of the population and is "used widely as a medium of communication" in day-to-day speech.  English is reserved for official interactions, such as "government and administration", although the use of Sesotho in politics, religion, and the mass media is growing.

Primary education of children takes place in Sesotho for the first four years, but English becomes the medium of instruction in the fifth year of primary school.  Competence in English is "particularly important ... for educational, political, social and economic transactions in the subcontinent" and facilitates obtaining employment within Lesotho and abroad.  Although "efforts are made to ensure that Basotho children" learn to read, speak and write English, many Basotho complete only "basic primary education [and] remain monolingual in Sesotho".

Minority and immigrant languages 

A minority of Basotho, estimated to number 248,000 , speak Zulu, one of the eleven official languages of South Africa.  Phuthi, a Nguni language closely related to Swazi, an official language of South Africa and Eswatini, is spoken by 43,000 Basotho.  Xhosa, another Nguni language and official language of South Africa, is spoken by 18,000 people in Lesotho.  Speakers of these minority languages typically also speak Sesotho.

Afrikaans, spoken mainly in South Africa and Namibia, is an immigrant language.

See also 
 Languages of South Africa
 Languages of Eswatini

Notes 
 Footnotes

 Citations

References